Malapua is a village in Ancuabe District in Cabo Delgado Province in northeastern Mozambique.

It is located several miles north-west of the district capital of Ancuabe.

References

External links 
Satellite map at Maplandia.com 

Populated places in Ancuabe District